Diffeo, Inc., is a software company that developed a collaborative intelligence text mining product for defense, intelligence and financial services customers.  

The Diffeo product is a recommender engine that analyzes text in a user's working documents, such as draft emails and web pages, identifying named entities and proposing related entities.

Diffeo was founded in 2012 and was acquired by Salesforce in 2019. The company grew out of NIST's Text Retrieval Conference where the founding team organized the Knowledge Base Acceleration (KBA) evaluation to measure the effectiveness of recommender engines.

History

Founding 
The company was founded by three Hertz Fellows, Dan Roberts, Max Kleiman-Weiner, and John Frank, a co-founder of MetaCarta.  The name Diffeo comes from a shortening of diffeomorphism, which two of the cofounders were learning about in a class about blackholes by Andrew Strominger. Diffeo was one of the first residents in hack/reduce.

Funding 
In 2016, the company raised a seed round of approximately two million dollars from investors including Basis Technology and Carahsoft.  Also in 2016, Diffeo acquired Meta, a search engine company founded by Jason Briggs, Emily Pavlini, and Aaron Taylor through a business plan competition at Williams College.

Research 
Diffeo's research focused on recommender engines and evaluation protocols for measuring the benefits of recommender engines for end users. As part of running the Knowledge Base Acceleration (KBA) track in NIST's Text Retrieval Conference from 2012 to 2014, the co-founders of Diffeo released a public dataset of timestamped news and blogs spanning approximately 12,000 hours. The KBA track aimed to measure approaches to accelerating the assimilation of knowledge into knowledge bases like Wikipedia.

The company's researchers published papers and open source code on machine learning techniques including Jacobian regularization, singular spectrum analysis, and hierarchical agglomerative clustering for entity disambiguation.

Post-Acquisition 
In 2021, Salesforce announced an AI-powered assistant that helps B2B sales people with their deals. Briggs, who was previously CEO at Diffeo, is the Senior Director of Product Management, and helped in the creation of this AI assistant. This technology comes from Salesforce's acquisition of Diffeo, which also brought them Briggs.

Product & technology 
The Diffeo product, Diffeo Enterprise HierCoref (DEHC), is a recommender engine that allows users to "invite" an agent into their work documents in order to identify named entities and recommend related entities that it identifies by crawling the Web and the user's data repositories. For example, the product has plugins that enable it to analyze a user's emails and web pages open in their web browser.

The company's user meetings, called The AI<>Tradecraft Forum, brought together speakers from the information extraction industry and the US Intelligence Community, including NGA, United States Army, AFOSI, and NSA.

Awards 
Diffeo won the 2019 MassChallenge FinTech grand prize, was selected into the 2018 FinTech Innovation Lab and was one of 13 companies in the 2017 Salesforce AI Incubator. Diffeo won the Hertz Foundation's 2015 Newman Entrepreneurial Initiative.

The company was also a performer in DARPA's Memex program, and won the grand prize in the NGA Disparate Data Challenge.

See also 

 Collaborative intelligence
 Text Retrieval Conference
 Recommender engine
 Named-entity recognition
 Salesforce

External links
 
 Diffeo on Github.com
 Hierarchical agglomerative clustering library written in Rust:  https://github.com/diffeo/kodama
 https://trec-kba.org/
 https://trec-dd.org/
 TREC KBA Streamcorpus at http://s3.amazonaws.com/aws-publicdatasets/trec/kba/index.html
 TREC KBA corpus information at NIST https://trec.nist.gov/data/kba.html

References

Salesforce
Data visualization software
Business software companies
Data analysis software
Business intelligence companies
Data companies
American companies established in 2012
Software companies established in 2012
2019 mergers and acquisitions
Defunct software companies of the United States